Agathis dammara, commonly known as the Amboina pine or dammar pine, is a coniferous timber tree native to Sulawesi, the Maluku Islands and the Philippines.

Description

Agathis dammara is a medium-large conifer up to 60 metres in height found in tropical rainforests, growing from sea level to very high mountainous regions where it becomes extremely stunted. It belongs to the southern hemisphere family Araucariaceae, widespread throughout the entire Mesozoic, emerging about 200 million years ago. An extinct genus, Protodammara (which appeared long ago, during the Mesozoic), derives its name from this tree. This tree is a source of dammar gum, also known as cat-eye resin.

Taxonomy
When first discovered and listed as a species it was placed in the genus Pinus (Lambert, 1803), and then later with the firs, Abies (Poir 1817), and then with its own genus, Dammara. It was first recognised as being part of Agathis in 1807, when it was listed as Agathis loranthifolia, and beyond that with species names beccarii, celebica and macrostachys, although it acquired many more names before dammara was settled on.

Agathis celebica and Agathis philippinensis were previously considered distinct species but since 2010 have been synonymous with Agathis dammara.

References

External links

Agathis dammara at the Gymnosperm Database.

dammara
Trees of the Maluku Islands
Trees of the Philippines
Trees of Sulawesi
Plants described in 1803